The 1962 College Football All-America team is composed of college football players who were selected as All-Americans by various organizations and writers that chose College Football All-America Teams in 1962.  The six selectors recognized by the NCAA as "official" for the 1962 season are (1) the American Football Coaches Association (AFCA), (2) the Associated Press (AP), (3) the Football Writers Association of America (FWAA), (4) the Newspaper Enterprise Association (NEA), (5) the Sporting News, and (6) the United Press International (UPI).

Consensus All-Americans
For the year 1962, the NCAA recognizes six published All-American teams as "official" designations for purposes of its consensus determinations. The following chart identifies the NCAA-recognized consensus All-Americans and displays which first-team designations they received.

All-American selections for 1962

Ends
Pat Richter, Wisconsin (AFCA-1, AP-1, FWAA, NEA-3, SN-1, UPI, Time, WC)
Hal Bedsole, Southern California (AFCA-1, AP-3, FWAA, NEA-1, SN-1, UPI, WC)
Dave Robinson, Penn State (AFCA-2, AP-1, NEA-1, FWAA, SN-2, Time)
Conrad Hitchler, Missouri (AP-3, FWAA, NEA-2)
Hugh Campbell, Washington State (AFCA-2, AP-2, NEA-3, SN-2)
Tom Hutchinson, Kentucky (AFCA-3, AP-2, SN-3)
Vern Burke, Oregon State (AFCA-3, NEA-2)
Woody Dabbs, Ole Miss (SN-3)

Tackles
Bobby Bell, Minnesota (AFCA-1, AP-1, FWAA, NEA-1, SN-1, UPI, Time, WC)
Jim Dunaway, Mississippi (AFCA-2, NEA-1, SN-1, UPI, Time, WC)
Don Brumm, Purdue (AFCA-3 [guard], AP-1, FWAA, NEA-2)
Steve Barnett, Oregon (AFCA-1, FWAA, NEA-3, SN-3)
Fred Miller, LSU (AFCA-3, AP-3, FWAA, NEA-2, SN-2)
Art Gregory, Duke (AP-2)
Ray Schoenke, SMU (AP-2)
Bob Vogel, Ohio State (AFCA-2, SN-2)
Scott Appleton, Texas (AFCA-3)
Tom Nomina, Miami (Ohio) (AP-3)
Charles Sieminsky, Penn State (NEA-3, SN-3)

Guards
Johnny Treadwell, Texas (AFCA-1, AP-1, FWAA, NEA-1, SN-1, UPI, WC)
Jack Cvercko, Northwestern (AFCA-2, AP-3, NEA-2, SN-1, UPI, Time, WC)
Rufus Guthrie, Georgia Tech (AFCA-1, AP-2, FWAA, NEA-2)
Jean Berry, Duke (FWAA)
Leon Cross, Oklahoma (AP-2, FWAA, NEA-3, SN-3)
Damon Bame, USC (AP-1)
Ed Budde, Michigan State (Time)
Tom Hertz, Missouri (AFCA-3, NEA-3, SN-2)
Dave Watson, Georgia Tech (SN-2)
Gene McDowell, Florida State (AP-3)
Steve Underwood, Wisconsin (SN-3)

Centers
Lee Roy Jordan, Alabama (AFCA-1, AP-1, FWAA, NEA-1, SN-1, UPI, Time, WC)
Donald McKinnon, Dartmouth (AFCA-3, AP-2, NEA-1 [guard], FWAA, SN-3)
Dave Behrman, Michigan State (AFCA-2, SN-2)
Ray Mansfield, Washington (AFCA-2 [guard], AP-3)
Wayne Lee, Oklahoma (NEA-2)
Billie Joe Armstrong, Ohio State (NEA-3)

Quarterbacks
Terry Baker, Oregon State (AP-1, NEA-1, UPI, WC, AFCA-1, FWAA, SN-1, Time)
George Mira, Miami (Fla) (AFCA-2, AP-1, FWAA, SN-2)
Glynn Griffing, Mississippi (AP-2, FWAA, NEA-2, SN-3)
Tom Myers, Northwestern (AFCA-3)
Daryle Lamonica, Notre Dame (AP-3)
Bill King, Dartmouth (NEA-3)

Halfbacks
Jerry Stovall, LSU (AFCA-1, AP-1, FWAA, NEA-1, SN-1, UPI, Time, WC)
Mel Renfro, Oregon (AFCA-2, AP-2, NEA-2, SN-1, UPI, Time, WC)
Billy Moore, Arkansas (AP-2, NEA-1, FWAA)
Dave Hoppman, Iowa State (AP-3, FWAA)
Roger Kochman, Penn State (AFCA-1, SN-2) 
Joe Don Looney, Oklahoma (SN-2)
Kermit Alexander, UCLA (AFCA-2)
Jim Pilot, New Mexico State (NEA-2)
Billy Gambrell, South Carolina (AFCA-3) 
Jerry Yost, West Virginia (AP-3)
Bobby Santiago, New Mexico (AP-3)
Paul Flatley, Northwestern (SN-3)
Johnny Roland, Missouri (SN-3)
Pete Pedro, West Texas State (NEA-3)
Gary Wood, Cornell (NEA-3)
Mike McNames, Georgia Tech (NEA-3)

Fullbacks
George Saimes, Michigan State (AFCA-1, AP-1, FWAA, NEA-2, SN-1, UPI, WC)
Eldon Fortie, BYU (AFCA-3 [halfback], AP-2 [quarterback], NEA-1)
Tom Myers, Syracuse (FWAA)
Ray Poage, Texas (SN-2, Time) 
Bill Thornton, Nebraska (AFCA-2, SN-3)
Ed Cummings, Stanford (AFCA-3)

Key

Official selectors

Other selectors

See also
 1962 All-Atlantic Coast Conference football team
 1962 All-Big Eight Conference football team
 1962 All-Big Ten Conference football team
 1962 All-Pacific Coast football team
 1962 All-SEC football team
 1962 All-Southwest Conference football team

References

All-America Team
College Football All-America Teams